Galeata is a genus of gastropods belonging to the family Clausiliidae.

The species of this genus are found in Eastern Mediterranean.

Species:

Galeata amanica 
Galeata antiochica 
Galeata cilicica 
Galeata galeata 
Galeata schwerzenbachii 
Galeata tumluensis

References

Clausiliidae